Douglas Haig Herman (18 March 1917 – 20 September 1995) was a New Zealand field athlete and rugby union player. He represented his country in the shot put at the 1950 British Empire Games, and captained the Canterbury provincial rugby team in the years following World War II. He played about 120 first-class rugby games, including 91 for Canterbury.

Herman won the New Zealand national shot put title on five occasions: in 1938, 1939, 1945, 1946, and 1950.

References

1917 births
1995 deaths
New Zealand male shot putters
Athletes (track and field) at the 1950 British Empire Games
Commonwealth Games competitors for New Zealand
new Zealand rugby union players
Canterbury rugby union players
Rugby union flankers